Gonzalo Correal Urrego (Gachalá, Colombia, 23 October 1939) is a Colombian anthropologist, palaeontologist and archaeologist. He has been contributing to the knowledge of prehistoric Colombia for over forty years and has published in Spanish and English. Correal Urrego is considered one of the most important anthropologists of Colombia. He has collaborated with many other anthropologists and archaeologists, among others Thomas van der Hammen and Ana María Groot.

Biography 
Gonzalo Correal Urrego was born in the village of Gachalá, in the eastern part of the Colombian department of  Cundinamarca. Already as a child he did his first archaeological excavations in the Cuevas de los Alpes in his home village. He attended the Colegio de San Bartolomé La Merced, graduating in 1958. Correal went on to study anthropology and law and political sciences simultaneously at the Instituto Colombiano de Antropología e Historia and Universidad Libre respectively. In 1964 he obtained his degree in anthropology and in 1966 his PhD in law and political sciences.

As of 1966 he was a professor at the Universidad de Antioquia and between 1968 and 1971 at the Department of Anthropology of the Universidad Nacional de Colombia in Bogotá. From 1975 to 1995 Correal Urrego was professor in anthropology and archaeology at the Universidad Nacional.

Correal Urrego has investigated the preceramic period in Colombia (El Abra, Tequendama, Aguazuque, Tibitó, among others) and contributed to the knowledge of the Herrera Period, Muisca, Panches, Quimbaya and more. He also analysed the Pleistocene megafauna that still existed at the time of the first human populations in South America. Among those the mastodont of Zarzal.

Correal Urrego has been awarded various awards for his contributions in the fields of archaeology and anthropology, among others Primer Premio Nacional de Antropología y Arqueología in 1975, Profesor Emérito, Universidad Nacional de Colombia in 1983, Maestro Universitario, Universidad Nacional de Colombia in 1994, Profesor Honorario, Universidad Nacional de Colombia in 1995.

In 2007 Correal Urrego received recognition for his forty-year career at the Universidad Nacional with the Vida y Obra award. In 2015 the Universidad del Magdalena of Santa Marta awarded Correal the Medalla de Sierra Nevada de Santa Marta and in the same year the Instituto Colombiano de Antropología e Historia honoured Correal Urrego for his work.

Works 
This list is a selection.

Books 
 2012 - Introducción a la paleopatología precolombina
 1990 - Aguazuque: evidencias de cazadores, recolectores y plantadores en la altiplanicie de la Cordillera Oriental
 1983 - Investigación arqueológica en el municipio de Zipacón, Cundinamarca
 1981 - Evidencias culturales y megafauna pleistocénica en Colombia
 1979 - Investigaciones arqueológicas en abrigos rocosos de Nemocón y Sueva
 1977 - Exploraciones arqueológicas en la costa Atlantica y valle del Magdalena: sitios preceramicos y tipologias liticas
 1977 - Investigaciones arqueológicas en los abrigos rocosos del Tequendama: 12.000 Años de historia del hombre y su medio ambiente en la altiplanicie de Bogotá

Articles 
 2007 - Zipaquirá 400 años. Aspectos Arqueológicos y Etnohistóricos
 2007 - Human Skeletal Remains from Sabana de Bogotá, Colombia. A case of Paleoamerican Morphology late Survival in South América - American Journal of Physical Anthropology
 1994 - Evidence of mitochondrial DNA. Diversity in South American aboriginals
 1992 - The Sedimentary Infill of the Sabana de Bogotá Basin and its Palaeoc1imatological Implications
 1988 - Controlling the Water table During Resume Excavations an Example from Tibitó 1. A Preceramic kill site
 1987 - Paleopathology in Preceramic Bones from Colombia: Examples of Syphilitic lesions from the Site of Aguazuque, Soacha
 1978 - Pre-historical man on the Sabana de Bogotá. Data for and Ecological Prehistoric
 1973 - Evidencias de Cirugía Craneana Prehistórica en Colombia
 1972 - Preceramic Sequences in El Abra Rock Shelters, Colombia - Science
 1971 - Hacia los orígenes y la antigüedad del hombre en Colombia: Comprobada científicamente su existencia hace más de 12.400 años
 1966 - La Leyenda del Dorado Laguna de Guatavita

See also 

List of Muisca scholars
Muisca
Aguazuque, Tequendama, Tibitó

References

Notable works by Correal Urrego

External links 
  Interview with Gonzalo Correal Urrego

1939 births
Free University of Colombia alumni
Colombian anthropologists
20th-century Colombian historians
Colombian archaeologists
Muisca scholars
Living people
21st-century Colombian historians